The West Broad Street Industrial and Commercial Historic District is a national historic district located at Richmond, Virginia.  The district encompasses 29 contributing buildings and 1 contributing object built between 1902 and the 1930s. The  District is characterized by a variety of architectural styles, including large industrial vernacular buildings, standard post-1900 commercial storefronts, and a large Modern-style department store. The majority of the buildings are two-to-four stories in height and are composed of brick with stucco, stone and metal detailing.  Notable buildings include Putney Shoe Factory (1910), C.F. Sauer Headquarters (1910), L.H. Jenkins Book Manufactory (1902), Virginia School Supply Company (1913), the Coca-Cola Bottling Plant (1925), and the former Sears department store (c. 1946).  Located in the district is the separately listed Atlantic Motor Company.

It was added to the National Register of Historic Places in 2011.

References

Historic districts on the National Register of Historic Places in Virginia
Commercial buildings on the National Register of Historic Places in Virginia
Industrial buildings and structures on the National Register of Historic Places in Virginia
Buildings and structures in Richmond, Virginia
National Register of Historic Places in Richmond, Virginia